The Petit Trianon (French for "small Trianon") is a Neoclassical style château located on the grounds of the Palace of Versailles in Versailles, France. It was built between 1762 and 1768 during the reign of King Louis XV of France. The Petit Trianon was constructed within the park of a larger royal retreat known as the Grand Trianon.

Design and construction
The Petit Trianon was built on the site of a botanical garden developed about a decade earlier by Louis XV, within the grounds of the Grand Trianon, Louis XIV's retreat from the Palace of Versailles to the southeast. It was designed by Ange-Jacques Gabriel by order of Louis XV for his long-term mistress, Madame de Pompadour, and was constructed between 1762 and 1768. Madame de Pompadour died four years before its completion, and the Petit Trianon was subsequently occupied by her successor, Madame du Barry. Upon his accession to the throne in 1774, the 20-year-old Louis XVI gave the château and its surrounding park to his 19-year-old Queen Marie Antoinette for her exclusive use and enjoyment.

The Petit Trianon is an example of the transition from the Rococo style of the earlier part of the 18th century to the Neoclassical style of the 1760s and onward. It attracts interest in its four facades, each designed according to that part of the estate it would face. The Corinthian order predominates, with two freestanding and two engaged columns on the side of the formal French garden, and pilasters facing both the courtyard and the area once occupied by Louis XV's greenhouses. Overlooking the former botanical garden of the king, the remaining façade was left bare.

Marie Antoinette would visit the Petit Trianon to escape the formality of court life and to rest from her royal responsibilities. Since all were de par la Reine (by order of the Queen), none were permitted to enter the property without the Queen's permission. Only the Queen's "inner circle" (including the princesse de Lamballe and Gabrielle de Polastron, duchesse de Polignac) were invited, which alienated the court nobility. In the spring of 1779, Marie Antoinette retired to the Petit Trianon to recover from illness after the birth of her daughter Marie-Thérèse. Her entire household came with her, as well as four male friends to attend to her: the Duke of Coigny, the Duke of Guines, Count Valentin Esterhazy, and the Baron of Besenval. This was in violation of court etiquette, causing gossip to circulate at Versailles and "the malicious insinuations against her which became so common later on."

The building was designed to require as little interaction between guests and servants as possible. To that end, the table in the salles à manger was conceived to be mobile, mechanically lowered and raised through the floorboards so that the servants below could set places while remaining unseen. The tables were never built, but the delineation for the mechanical apparatus can still be seen from the foundation. 

In the attic, a suite was constructed for Louis XV by Ange-Jacques Gabriel, consisting of antechamber, bedroom, and a private chamber. A staircase led from his private chamber down to the mezzanine where Mme Du Barry resided. In Marie Antoinette's time, the attic apartment remained reserved for Louis XVI, though he never slept at the Petit Trianon. The private staircase of Louis XV was removed, allowing a library to be constructed by Richard Mique. The mezzanine, which is above the Queen's apartment, was reserved for Marie Antoinette's lady-in-waiting and first lady-in-waiting.

Within the Queen's apartment, the décor of her boudoir features mirrored panels that, by the turning of a crank, can be raised or lowered to obscure the windows and reflect the candlelight. Her bedroom was provided with furniture from Georges Jacob and Jean Henri Riesener. Jacob designed a set of furniture for the room known as the Mobilier aux épis, elaborately carved with flowers and garlands and upholstered in embroidered Lyon silk. The wallpaper was painted by Jean-Baptiste Pillement.

French Revolution and Republic
On 5 October 1789, Marie Antoinette was in the gardens of the Petit Trianon when a page brought news of the imminent arrival of an armed crowd from Paris. With the enforced departure of the royal family the next day, the Petit Trianon was almost abandoned, except for the gardeners and other staff who continued to live there. Renovations that had been underway were interrupted, leaving large sums owed to builders. The former queen's gardener, Antoine Richard, was appointed as curator of the gardens and plant nursery in 1792 by the Minister of the Interior.  After the final overthrow of the monarchy in July 1792, all of the furniture, artworks, and other valuables of the Petit Trianon were sent to auction, under a decree of the Convention dated 10 June 1793. The auction began on Sunday, 25 August 1793, and continued until 11 August 1794. The properties sold were widely scattered. Silverware, lead, and brass fixtures were requisitioned for use in the arsenals. The sculptor Amable Boichard was appointed in April 1794 to remove "emblems of royalty and feudalism" from the property.

Under the new Republic, the Petit Trianon underwent a number of changes. Declared national property, the land was divided into ten lots. The City of Versailles proposed that a botanical garden be established, but this plan was never adopted. In 1796, the land was leased to a tavern. By 1801, the use of the grounds for dances and festivals led to neglect and vandalism. The buildings of the hamlet were reported to be dilapidated. Some improvements in the layout of the gardens were subsequently made, and a school located in part of the complex.

Napoleonic period
After some years of semi-neglect, the Petit Trianon resumed its traditional role when the new emperor, Napoleon, granted the use of the building to his sister Pauline. Extensive refurbishing of roofs, piping, floors, and chimneys was carried out. The main rooms were repainted, and mirrors were installed to replace those sold or vandalized. Finally, paintings were hung and a bridge de la Réunion constructed to link open areas across a hollow road.

Derivative buildings

United States 
Nemours Estate mansion and gardens, in Wilmington, Delaware, is the largest formal French garden in America. It was built between 1909 and 1935, and was inspired and largely based on the Petit Trianon.
Belmar (1937) is an exact replica of the Petit Trianon, designed by Colorado architect Jacques Benedict for May Bonfils Stanton in Lakewood, Colorado.
City Hall (1916) in Eau Claire, Wisconsin as designed by George Awsumb is inspired by Petit Trianon, though not a complete copy.
Marble House (1888–1892), a Gilded Age mansion in Newport, Rhode Island, is directly inspired by the Petit Trianon.
Kentucky Governor's Mansion (1912) is inspired by the Petit Trianon.
Koshland House (1904) in San Francisco, California as designed by Franklin S. Van Trees was modeled after the Petit Trianon.
A concert hall in San Jose, California, which carries the name "The Petit Trianon," is a copy.
Byers Hall (1903) at Yale University, is an adaptation of Le Petit Trianon design by architects Hiss and Weekes.
Northway (1908), also known as Petit Trianon Deux, is an estate in Greenwich, Connecticut, built by an heir to the Goodyear Tires fortune.
The International Museum of Surgical Science (1917) in Chicago, Illinois is a replica of Le Petit Trianon except it has an additional floor.

Elsewhere 

 Called Petit Trianon, the building housing the Academia Brasileira de Letras in Rio de Janeiro is based on the design. It was built by the French Government and donated to the Academia de Letras.
 Sabet Pasal Mansion, the home of an Iranian pre-revolution entrepreneurial family, was built in northern Tehran.
 The Cantacuzino Palace in Romania, near Florești, also known as Petit Trianon (Micul Trianon), is based on the layout of the French palace.

See also
 Hameau de la Reine
 Maison de plaisance
 Moberly–Jourdain incident
 Public Establishment of the Palace, Museum and National Estate of Versailles
 Subsidiary structures of the Palace of Versailles

References

Further reading
Arizzoli-Clémentel, Pierre. Views and Plans of the Petit Trianon. Paris: Alain de Gourcuff Éditeur, 1998. Print.

External links

Ancient Places TV: HD Video of The Queen's Hamlet at the Petit Trianon
PDF from the manuscript R. Mique, Recueil des plans du Petit Trianon, 1786

Houses completed in 1768
Palace of Versailles
1768 establishments in France
Royal residences in France
Buildings and structures in Versailles
Palaces in France